

About SPE—Inspiring Plastics Professionals 
SPE—Inspiring Plastics Professionals is a global professional membership organization dedicated to the advancement of knowledge and education for professionals employed in the plastics industry. SPE was founded in 1942. Today, the organization has more than 22,500+ members who are plastics professionals throughout the United States and in more than 84 countries around the world.

Membership in SPE helps plastics professionals advance their technical knowledge through conferences, seminars, webinars, SPE Library, Technical Journals, Plastics Engineering magazine, SPE News, Plastics Insight Newsletter, SPE Communities, Materials Database, Networking Opportunities, and more. Membership levels include: Professional Membership, Young Professional Membership, Student Membership, Emeritus Membership, and Subscriber.

SPE is divided into local and geographical chapters and technical chapters. The organization is managed by an association management staff with the support of volunteer leadership, including an Executive Board. Chapters exist around the world in over 70 countries. Many chapters publish local newsletters as well as organize technical and networking meetings.

Members of SPE are also members of one or more of 32 specific technical chapters. Technical chapters are focused on: Additive Manufacturing & 3D Printing, Additives and Color Europe, Applied Rheology, Automotive, Bioplastics and Renewable Technologies, Blow Molding, Building and Infrastructure, Color and Appearance, Composites, Decorating and Coatings, Engineering Properties and Structure, European Medical Polymers, European Thermoforming, Extrusion, Failure Analysis & Prevention, Flexible Packaging, Injection Molding, Joining of Plastics & Composites, Medical Plastics, Mold Technologies, Non-Halogen Flame Retardant Materials, Plastics Pipes & Fittings, Polymer Analysis, Polymer Modifiers and Additives, Product Design and Development, Rotational Molding, Recycling, Thermoforming, Thermoplastic Elastomers, Thermoplastic Materials and Foams, Thermoset, and Vinyl Plastics.

SPE Foundation 
The SPE Foundation supports the development of plastics professionals by funding quality educational programs, grants and scholarships emphasizing science, engineering, sustainability, and manufacturing while working to create inclusive opportunities for students around the world.

Through lively demonstrations and hands-on activities, the Foundation's PlastiVan® Program is designed to excite students about opportunities in science and engineering within the plastics industry. Students are educated about the chemistry, history, processing, manufacturing, and sustainability of plastics and how the science and real-world applications relate to their everyday lives. PlastiVan® provides sound science and educational programs which spark scientific curiosity in students while increasing their knowledge of the contribution plastics make to modern life; encouraging them to seek careers in engineering. The program is aligned with NGSS standards.

The SPE Foundation offers numerous scholarships to students who have demonstrated or expressed an interest in the plastics industry. They must be majoring in or taking courses that would be beneficial to a career in the plastics industry. This would include, but is not limited to, plastics engineering, polymer science, chemistry, physics, chemical engineering, mechanical engineering, industrial engineering, journalism or communications. All applicants must be in good standing with their colleges.

ANTEC® 
SPE holds its "Annual Technical Conference" or ANTEC®, each spring. ANTEC® is held in various locations throughout North America. The meeting includes presentations of peer-reviewed technical papers about plastics innovations and technologies from around the world. ANTEC® showcases the latest advances in industrial, national laboratory and academic work. Papers and presentations share findings in polymer research and new and improved products and technologies.

Plastics Engineering 
SPE's Plastics Engineering magazine keeps plastics professionals and other specialists in the value chain up to date on the latest materials equipment and process technologies that impact all aspects of product development and applications in the plastics industry. Plastics Engineering also covers the trends and influences that affect plastics in key global markets.

References

External links
 
 IM Engineering South and SPE Partner to Host ANTEC and DEI in Manufacturing Conferences
 "IME South" Event Launch Draws Attendees from 3M, Amazon, DuPont, Johnson & Johnson, Space X, Stryker, Toyota, Among Others
 Dr. Brian Landes Honored with SPE’s President’s Cup Award
 SPE Launches New Podcast at ANTEC®
 Plastics Engineering and PlastChicks Win Gold in Association Trends 2022 Trendy Awards
 Meet SPE President Jason Lyons
 PlastiVan Partners with Detroit STEM Project to Reach Students in Urban Settings
 SPE Announces Four-Year Contract Extension with CEO Patrick Farrey
 SPE Announces Four-Year Contract Extension with SPE Foundation Chief Executive Eve Vitale
 Conor Carlin, SPE's VP Sustainability Interviewed by Plastics Today
 Ampacet's Gustavo Lidzki Appointed SPE VP At Large
 SPE and the Societies Consortium on Sexual Harassment Focus on Removing Barriers to Inclusion
 A "Live" to "Virtual Pivot in 13 Days
 Landes Assumes Role of President of the Society of Plastics Engineers
 SPE's New Brand Identity and Website Reflect Change

Plastics industry organizations
International professional associations
Organizations established in 1942
1942 establishments in the United States
Engineering societies based in the United States